Seth Jagger Raynor (May 7, 1874 – January 23, 1926) was an American golf course architect and engineer. He designed approximately 85 golf courses in about 13 years, his first in 1914, at age 40. His mentor was Charles Blair Macdonald, the creator of the National Golf Links of America, and a member of the World Golf Hall of Fame.

Raynor was also the mentor of Charles Banks who completed many of Raynor's unfinished works after he died. Banks went on to a solo design career, creating approximately 15 courses.

Raynor was born in Manorville, New York. He attended Princeton University, studying civil engineering, before leaving in 1898 without a degree. He married Araminta (known as Minta) Hallock in 1903, and for the first years of his working life, engineered drains, roads and waterworks in the area around Southampton, N.Y. where his family had relocated and where he would live for the rest of his life.

Golf course engineer, architect 
In 1908, Raynor was hired to perform a boundary survey of the site for the new course National Golf Links of America, in Southampton Long Island, by Macdonald. When it opened, NGLA was considered the finest American golf course and remains one of the top design in the world. Macdonald was impressed with Raynor and the two forged a working relationship and Raynor overseeing the construction of every course designed by Macdonald from then on, including Piping Rock Club, St. Louis Country Club, and the Mid Ocean Club, approximately 15 in all. By 1914, Raynor was handling his first solo design projects, including the Country Club of Fairfield, in Connecticut, and Westhampton Country Club on Long Island, New York. Between 1914 and 1917, Raynor oversaw the construction of The Lido Golf Club, designed by Macdonald. This was one of the most difficult and expensive golf projects to that date.

Raynor, who rarely played golf, never became adept at the sport, reportedly not wanting to design around his own game.

All of Raynor's courses feature adaptations of some of what Macdonald considered the ideal golf in the British Isles and Europe, such as the Redan, Biarritz, Eden, Leven, Road and Maiden. Raynor, like Macdonald and later Charles Banks, fit the concept of the originals into the particular site, never seeking to duplicate them. Raynor never saw any of the originals in person. On every Raynor golf course, though, some of if not the finest holes to be found are ones Raynor created with basing them on ideal golf holes.

Several of Raynor's designs have hosted and continue to host significant events. His Waialae Country Club in Honolulu has hosted the PGA Tour's Sony Open since the 1960s, making it one of the longest-running host sites on the Tour. At The Greenbrier in White Sulphur Springs, West Virginia, his Old White TPC Course hosted a PGA Tour event. The Country Club of Charleston hosted the 2019 U.S. Women's Open won by Lee Jeong-eun also known as Jeongeun Lee6.

Raynor died with his wife by his side from pneumonia in 1926, age 51, while in West Palm Beach, Florida, to open Paris Singer's private course, often mistaken for the Everglades Golf Club, which Singer founded and Raynor designed.

Notable golf courses
Augusta Country Club - Bon Air Hotel, Lake Course,(no longer in existence) Private, - Augusta, GA
Blue Mound Golf & Country Club - Private in Wauwatosa, WI
Chicago Golf Club—redesign of Charles Blair Macdonald's design with Macdonald's blessing - Private in Wheaton, IL
Essex County Country Club - Private in West Orange, NJ
Fishers Island Club - Private in Fishers Island, NY
The Greenbrier - Resort in White Sulphur Springs, WV
Greenbrier Course
Old White TPC Course
Hotchkiss School - Semi-Private in Lakeville, CT
Monterey Peninsula Country Club, Dunes Course - Private in Pebble Beach, CA 
Morris County Golf Club, Private in Convent Station, NJ
Waialae Country Club - Private in Honolulu, HI
Yale University Golf Course - Private in New Haven, CT 
Yeamans Hall Club - Private in Hanahan, SC

References

External links
 "Roseville golf course unearths renowned designer’s blueprints in time for renovation," by Joe Bissen, St. Paul (MN)Pioneer Press, April 29, 2018
 "The Top 10 Seth Raynor Courses"
Golfcoursearchitecture.net

1874 births
1926 deaths
American engineers
Golf course architects
Princeton University alumni
People from Long Island